The Catholic Church in Norway (where the state church is Lutheran) and its overseas territories has no ecclesiastical province nor belongs to any (all sees being exempt, i.e. directly subject to the Holy See) nor has a national episcopal conference, but the Norwegian Catholic episcopate partakes in the Episcopal conference of Scandinavia.

The three territorial sees are all part of the Latin Church:
 one diocese in the national capital 
 two missionary territorial prelatures

The Eastern Catholics are pastorally served by a transnational apostolic exarchate from Germany.

There formally is also an Apostolic Nunciature to Norway, as papal embassy-level diplomatic representation, albeit vested in the Apostolic Nunciature to Sweden (in Djursholm), as are the nunciatures to Denmark, Finland and Iceland, covering the Nordic countries.

Current jurisdictions

Latin jurisdictions 
 Roman Catholic Diocese of Oslo, which also covers Bouvet island
 Roman Catholic Territorial Prelature of Tromsø, which also covers Svalbard and Jan Mayen (Spitzbergen)
 Roman Catholic Territorial Prelature of Trondheim

Eastern Catholic jurisdiction 
Ukrainian Catholic Church (Byzantine rite in Ukrainian language)

 Ukrainian Catholic Apostolic Exarchate in Germany and Scandinavia, also covering Germany (with the see in Münich), Denmark, Finland and Sweden

Defunct Latin jurisdictions 
Early in the 11th century, Norway became christianed. In the Middle Ages, Norway's territory was different, greater than the present. Below is a list of dioceses within the then boundaries, before the Protestant Reformation.

Dioceses subordinate the Archdiocese of Nidaros 
The Ancient Nidaros Diocese (1015 - 1152) covered North-Western and Northern Norway before the Archdiocese was established.

Metropolitan Archdiocese of Nidaros (at Trondheim)

The Catholic Archdiocese of Nidaros (1152 - 1537) headed an ecclesiastical province which included the following suffragan dioceses.

Post-Reformation 
''Only direct precursors of the current sees.

See also 
 List of Catholic dioceses (structured view)

References

External links 
 GCatholic 

Lists of Roman Catholic dioceses by country

Catholic dioceses